Charles McHugh may refer to:

 Charles McHugh (politician) (1887–1927), Australian politician
 Charles McHugh (bishop) (1856–1926), Irish Roman Catholic bishop